Almabiston is a genus of moths in the family Geometridae.

Species
 Almabiston brunneum Djakonov, 1952

References
 Almabiston at Markku Savela's Lepidoptera and some other life forms

Bistonini
Geometridae genera